Railway electrification in Malaysia is a relatively recent development of rail transport in Malaysia. While the first railway in the country dates back to 1885, it was not until 3 August 1995 that the first electrified railway service, KTM Komuter, began operations.

The term "railway electrification" mainly refers to the project to electrify the Keretapi Tanah Melayu's West Coast Line from Padang Besar to Johor Bahru, combined with the duplication of the single-track line and the elimination of level crossings. As of November 2015, the stretch between Padang Besar and Gemas has been completed, with two electrified train services operating on the stretch: the KTM Komuter and the ETS.

Rapid transit and monorail systems in Malaysia are relatively new (the first of which is the Ampang Line on 16 December 1996); they are designed and built fully electrified and grade separated from the start.

Systems
 25 kV AC railway electrification - Used by KTM Komuter

Completed sections

Rawang-Ipoh

The double-tracking and electrification of this 179 km stretch of the main West Coast Line has enabled Keretapi Tanah Melayu Bhd to run trains at a maximum speed of 160 km/h between Kuala Lumpur and Ipoh.

This project, which had been beset by problems and delays, was completed in early 2008 and electric train services along the stretch commenced in 2010, cutting the journey time between Kuala Lumpur and  Ipoh to 2.5 hours. This project has also enabled KTMB to extend its KTM Komuter service to Tanjung Malim.

The infrastructure works component of the project was originally awarded to DRB-Hicom Berhad in 2000 for a value of RM2,579,920,005, while Mitsui of Japan was awarded the electrification and signalling component of the project worth RM1.9 billion supported by its principle sub-contractor, Siemens-Balfour Beatty Consortium. The contract between DRB-Hicom and the Malaysian government was signed on 2 April 2001. Four main subcontractors were appointed: Emrail Sdn Bhd for trackwork, Perspec Prime (Malaysia) Sdn Bhd for civil works, IJM Corporation Berhad for the construction of stations and UEM Construction Sdn Bhd for the construction of bridges.

The original completion date for DRB-Hicom was December 2003. The project however suffered problems which caused numerous delays, resulting in the government terminating the contract with DRB-Hicom and appointing UEM Construction Sdn Bhd, a subsidiary of UEM (Malaysia) Berhad, to take over the project from 1 June 2005.

At that stage, DRB-Hicom was said to have completed 88% of the work. DRB-Hicom said one of the main causes of the delays was a dispute over a variation order and losses and expenses with the government.

Although there were threats of litigation, the matter was submitted for arbitration and was finally settled in May 2006 with the government paying DRB-Hicom a sum of RM425 million. The company added that it was still in negotiations with the government over issues pertaining to liquidated ascertained damages and release of the performance bond. Mitsui had also submitted a claim for compensation for being unable to carry out the electrification part of the project because of the delays to civil works with the government settling on an undisclosed sum in December 2006.

On 17 January 2008, the double-tracking project between Rawang and Ipoh was officially completed. This was marked by an event where the Transport Minister officially declared the line opened.

Despite the completion of electrification and double-tracking, electric train services only began operating in 2010. Between 1 December 2008 and 2010, trains hauled by diesel locomotives were used, running 10 trips a day.

KTMB had initially planned to introduce a rapid intercity service between KL Sentral and Ipoh, running 16 services a day initially and ultimately 32 services a day. Currently, there are seven KTM ETS trips for each direction.

Sentul-Port Klang extension to Batu Caves

The 7.2 km extension to the Batu Caves branch line started at the end of 2006. The project - which will cost RM515mil - will include electrification, double-tracking and refitting the existing old track, signalling, communications, as well as construction of new stations at Sentul, Batu Kentonmen (English: Batu Cantonment), Kampung Batu (English: Batu Village), Taman Wahyu and Batu Caves. Sentul is currently the terminus for KTM Komuter's Sentul-Port Klang Line and the extension will enable the commuter train service to be extended to Batu Caves. Proposed during the 1990s, the project was initially given to DRB-Hicom Berhad and a letter of intent was issued by the Transport Ministry to the company on 13 April 2001. No letter of award was however issued and there was no movement until 2006 when site possession was given to contractor YTL Corporation Berhad on 17 November 2006. The project was completed in August 2010. The Sentul station is part of the Sentul Raya masterplan development under YTL Corporation Berhad.

Seremban-Gemas
On 7 January 2008, the government of Malaysia announced that the Indian company, Ircon International won the RM3.45 billion (US$1 billion) contract to build a double track from Seremban to Gemas. The 100 km  Seremban- Sungai Gadut double tracking project was scheduled to be completed by 2010 and to Gemas by 2012. The track involves 64.85 km stretch in Negeri Sembilan, 27.84 km in Melaka and 1.45 km in Johor. A 1.8 km tunnel and 9 bridges will be built in the process

On 23 May 2008, a joint venture between IJM and Norwest Corporation won a RM490.12 million contract from Ircon International to construct, commission and maintain infrastructure works for the electrified double-track project. The construction period is 21 months.

On 27 May 2008, a joint venture between Loh & Loh Corporation Bhd and Pasti Abadi Sdn Bhd won a RM273.01 million contract to construct, commission and maintain infrastructure works. The contract include site clearance, demolition and relocation works.

On 26 January 2010, Chief Minister of the state of Malacca, Datuk Seri Mohd Ali Rustam said the work on the dual-track railway was 32.81% completed and it was expected to be operational by August 2012. Once completed, the travel time between Malacca and Negeri Sembilan will be shortened and new six-coach trains capable of carrying 350 passengers at 140 km per hour will be used.

Part of the project, from Seremban railway station to Sungai Gadut Komuter station was completed in April 2011, and from Sungai Gadut Komuter station to Gemas railway station has been completed on 31 July 2013. The line was energised in stages starting with the Sungai Gadut - Rembau stretch in April 2013, Rembau - Batang Melaka stretch in early July 2013 and finally Batang Melaka - Gemas section in late July 2013. The line was completed on 30 October 2013.

Ipoh-Padang Besar
This project was proposed in 2002 as a continuation of the Rawang-Ipoh double-tracking and electrification project. Initially awarded to two consortium. The 329 km "Northern section" between Ipoh and Padang Besar was to be handled by a consortium made up of the Indian Railway Construction Company (Ircon), DRB-Hicom Berhad and Emrail Sdn Bhd while the "Southern section" between Seremban and Johor Bahru was to be handled by a consortium made up of the China Railway Engineering Corporation-China Railway Telecommunications Corporation (CRET), DRB-Hicom Berhad and Hikmat Asia Sdn Bhd. However, on 21 October 2003, a letter of award was issued to a 50:50 joint venture between Gamuda Berhad and Malaysian Mining Corporation Berhad. The change in contractors was based on the fact that Gamuda-MMC lowered the project cost to RM14.448bil, compared with over RM44bil by the two foreign contractors. Members of the two previous consortia were invited to be sub-contractors and were given the first right of refusal but the invitation was not taken up.

On 17 December 2003, not long after taking over from Dr Mahathir Mohamad, new Prime Minister Abdullah Ahmad Badawi announced that the Malaysian government had decided to postpone the project. The government revived the project in 2007 when on 16 March, Deputy Prime Minister Mohd Najib Abdul Razak announced that the Cabinet Committee on Public Transport had decided to revive the shelved Northern section double tracking project. On 21 April 2007, Transport Minister Chan Kong Choy confirmed Ircon's participation in the "revived double-tracking project" and that the company will undertake the Seremban-Gemas portion of the Seremban-Johor Baru.

On 6 June 2007, Gamuda Berhad announced to Bursa Malaysia that it had received a letter from the Economic Planning Unit of the Prime Minister's Department that the Malaysian government had agreed to Gamuda-MMC's proposal to implement the "Northern" section of the project on a private financing initiative basis. It added that negotiations on the formal agreement would begin as soon as possible. Transport Minister Chan Kong Choy said work on the Northern section will begin by the end of 2007 and is expected to be completed by Jan 2013.

On 14 December 2007, Gamuda announced that it together with MMC had received a letter of acceptance dated 13 December 2007 wherein the Malaysian Government accepted the proposal by the Gamuda-MMC joint venture to carry out the Electrified Double Tracking Project from Ipoh to Padang Besar on a design and build basis for a lump sum price of RM12.485 billion. The works comprises the design and construction of the infrastructure and system works in respect of the project which is to be completed within 60 months from the commencement date. The project cost has escalated due to rise in oil prices and building materials. The group managing director, Datuk Lin Yun Ling, added that the company will undertake only 20 percent of the whole project while the rest of the construction will be out sourced to various companies around the country. The project will be implemented as a construction contract with progressive payments, instead of private finance initiative envisioned earlier.  The design and build contract between the joint venture company and the government of Malaysia is formally signed on 25 July 2008.

The project will consist of two sections, a 171 km stretch from Ipoh to Butterworth and another 158 km stretch from Bukit Mertajam to Padang Besar. It is expected that the Ipoh-Butterworth section will given a higher priority as it is a continuation from the Rawang stretch, and will eventually shorten the travel time between Kuala Lumpur to Butterworth to 3.5 hours. The project will also feature a 3.3 km tunnel in Perak, which will become the longest rail tunnel in South East Asia.

The government has announced on 18 January 2008 that site possession has been given to Gamuda MMC on 8 January 2008. Work on the site is expected to start immediately thereafter and completed by 2013. It is also noted that the tracks will have the design speed of 160 to 180 km/h although the operator is expect to use only 140 to 160 km/h  

On 8 July 2008, The joint venture company has announced that electrification and power supply contract has been awarded to Balfour Beatty group with a contract value of GBP 160 million. Work is expected to start immediately and complete by January 2013. On the same day, the signalling and communication package has been awarded to Ansaldo STS. The contract is expected to be worth Euro 135 million.

In March 2009, the project reached the 20% milestone and three months later, it completed 25% overall. According to the developer, the project is on schedule with expected completion by January 2013.

In December 2009, Gamuda, one of the main contractors of the project has announced that the government have extended the deadline to complete the project by 11 months to December 2013. This is due to late approval of the design and late hand over of lands from the authorities.

Construction has completed in October 2014 for the entire stretch.

Current and future projects

Gemas-Johor Bahru

History of the Gemas- Johor Bahru EDTP 
The RM8 billion contract was expected to be tendered out by end 2008 pending a mid-term review of Ninth Malaysia Plan. The project would have included building over 200 km of parallel railway tracks, including stations, depots, halts, yards and bridges and cover systems such as electrification, signalling and communications.
This included the realignment between Pulau Sebang, Melaka to Gemas section.

In May 2009, Global Rail Sdn Bhd, a relatively small contractor and its Chinese partner, China Infraglobe submitted a proposal to the Government to build and upgrade tracks from Gemas to Johor Bahru at a cost of RM5 billion. According to them, the project would be on a Private Finance Initiative basis and the plan submitted to the Finance Ministry later in June 2009 was conditional upon signing over mineral rights in Johor State.

On 29 January 2011, Transport Minister Datuk Seri Kong Cho Ha said that The Gemas-Johor Bahru double-tracking and electrification project is expected to start that year. He added that the Government hoped to appoint the contractor for the project this year and Malaysia is still in the midst of talking with China Railway Construction, but nothing is confirmed yet. Kong said two consultants had been appointed, a design consultant and an independent checker, to monitor the project. The construction of the 197 km of tracks, at an estimated cost between RM6-7 billion, would take three years.

On 27 October 2015, the public display exercise, required for all development of new railways under Section 84 of Malaysia's Land Public Transport Act 2010, for the Gemas-Johor Bahru Electrification Double Tracking Project began and will run until 27 January 2016. According to documents on display to the public, construction is expected to begin in 2016 and be completed in 2022.

Current Developments 
The length of the line to be electrified and double-tracked is 197 km between Chainage 563.040 at Gemas and Chainage 754.180 at Johor Bahru. The upgraded line is supposed to cater for at least 22 services daily involving KTM ETS, KTM Intercity and shuttle train services.

The documents displayed also stated that the electrification for the stretch will have the same specifications as that of the Seremban-Gemas stretch, namely at 25 kV AC 50 Hz single phase and supplied via an overhead catenary. Train operations for this stretch will be integrated with the Train Control Centres at KL Sentral and Gemas. The designed speed for the tracks is 160 km/h.This is expected to reduce the time taken for travel between Kuala Lumpur and Johor Bahru from 6 hours to approximately 3.5 hours.

On 11 December 2015, the Chinese company China Railway Construction Company (CRCC) has been awarded to build the Gemas – Johor Bahru Electrification and Double-Tracking project within a consortium comprising itself, China Railway Engineering Corp (CREC) and China Communications Construction Corp (CCCC). A local joint- venture consortium, SIPP-YTL JV is the local sub contractor and is responsible for civil work including the upgrading of all stations. The construction is planned to start by Jan 2018 and is expected to complete by June 2023.

Terminal Skypark Line

The Electrified Double Tracking Project consists of two phases. Phase 1 is between Subang Jaya to Subang Skypark which has been awarded to Skypark Link-Lion Pacific and phase 2 is between Subang Skypark to KTM/MRT Sg. Buloh to relief rail cargo traffic bypass city centre of Kuala Lumpur.

The phase 1 between Subang Jaya and Terminal Skypark was funded by the Government through Ministry of Transport to provide rail based public transport especially to connect the Sultan Abdul Aziz Shah (SAAS) Airport Terminal 3 (Terminal Skypark) and the vicinity area with the existing railway. When complete, this line will be Malaysia's second airport rail link service, after the Express Rail Link (KLIA Ekspres). The phase 1 line was due to be completed by April 2018.

Generally, the project consists of two main section i.e. at grade section in between Subang Jaya and old Sri Subang spur line for the length of 4.09 km using the existing railway reserve previously funded by Petronas to transport fuel to the airport and also the new section in between new location of Sri Subang for the total length of 4.067 km which is elevated rail track along the existing Sungai Damansara river reserve and till end up at car park nearby Terminal Subang Skypark.

Klang Valley Double Track Project

The project was implemented by Keretapi Tanah Melayu began in 2016 and phase 1 is expected to be completed by 2021. This will focus on enhancing 16 stations along these routes and upgrade the existing signalling and electrification system. This will be reduced to just seven-and-a-half minutes once the KVDT is completed.

The 42 km rehabilitation under Phase I, which are:  
Phase 1A (Rawang – Simpang Batu)
Phase 1B (Kuala Lumpur – Simpang Bangsar)
Phase 2 (Simpang Batu – Kuala Lumpur)
Phase 3 (Sentul – Simpang Batu)
Phase 4 (Simpang Bangsar – Salak Selatan)

Phase II is from Simpang - Pelabuhan Klang and Salak Selatan - Seremban.

Other railway sections

Johor Bahru-Woodlands
There are no plans to electrify or double track the section of the West Coast Line linking Johor Bahru to Woodlands Train Checkpoint in Singapore. A Johor Bahru-Singapore Rapid Transit System is being built, and is expected to replace the last remaining section of the KTM rail link to Singapore.

East Coast Line
Currently there are no plans to electrify or double track the KTM East Coast Line.

Sabah State Railway
Currently there are no plans to electrify or double track the Sabah State Railway.

References

External links
 Ipoh-Padang Besar Electrified Double Track Project
 Seremban-Gemas Electrified Double Track
 Sepakat Setia Perunding Sdn Bhd
 Presentation by Dr A Adnan - Jan 2012

Rail infrastructure in Malaysia
Malaysia